Vaa Arugil Vaa is a 1991 Indian Tamil-language supernatural horror film starring Ramya Krishnan, Raja and Vaishnavi in lead roles. The film's concept was inspired from the American film Child's Play (1988). It was remade in Kannada in 1992 as Aathma Bandhana and in Odia as kandhai akhire luha (1993).

Plot 
A young woman (Vaishnavi) was married off to a man (Raja) thinking that she comes from a wealthy family. Her in-laws later found out that her family had fallen from grace and is now financially deprived. The devious in-laws then plotted a scheme to abuse her till she runs away from home so they could find a real rich bride for their son. One of their most devious schemes involved setting up the unfortunate bride with a manservant to look like she was being unfaithful to her husband. Her oblivious husband believed this ploy and is disgraced by her. Heartbroken and betrayed: the young woman was ostracised and overheard her in laws discussing their next scheme to drive her away from home. Out of a fit of rage – she threatened to tell her husband and ran away from the house only to be caught by her uncle in-law. They imprisoned her and beat her up. She almost made a successful escape when her father in-law broke a bottle and stabbed her with it. Bloodied and weak, she managed to get to her favourite doll and had her soul transferred in the doll upon dying. Her in-laws covered the murder by burning her in the Hindu ceremonial fire (stashing her cadaver under stacks of wood), lit by her own husband unbeknownst to him.

The groom married another bride (Ramya Krishnan) and she is a very lovely person. Her husband is still mourning the death of his first wife – whom he had loved dearly – hence was emotionally distant to his new wife. Meanwhile, the soul of his deceased first wife had been residing in the said doll, waiting for her vengeance. The ghost of his first wife managed to kill her in laws one by one in gruesome ways, often taunting before she finishes them off. She then became a little too angry and plans to kill her husband for being oblivious to the mistreatment of her in-laws and the new wife who took her place. The new wife suspected that something was wrong with the doll in the storeroom and tried to explain to her new husband but was brushed off. When the doll finally made her move to kill the new wife, she pleaded not to kill her and her husband but was cut off by the ghost doll, lamenting how she was unjustly treated and wants her justice. The new wife explained that although her anger was rational, her vengeance against her and the husband was unfounded. The ghost doll challenged the new wife for a game of cat and mouse and eventually, the new wife wins after killing the ghost doll with Amman's trident.

This film was filmed in the village of Valivalam in Thiruvarur district, Tamil Nadu, India.

Cast 
 Raja as Ramu (a) Ramakrishnan
 Vaishnavi as Lakshmi, Ramu's First Wife
 Ramya Krishnan as Chandra, Ramu's Second Wife
 Radha Ravi as Nalla Thambi
 S. S. Chandran as Muthu Manickam's Accountant
 K. K. Soundar as Arunagiri, Lakshmi's Father
 Vijaya Chandrika as Vadivu, Raja's Mother
 Nandhakumar
 Karate Thyagarajan as Muthu Manickam
 Veera Raghavan as Advocate Varadharajan
 Sudha
 T. S. Krishnamoorthi
 Thedir Kannaiah
 Mohan
 J. Gopalsaamy
 Master Rajkumar as Kannan

Soundtrack 
Music was by Chanakya and lyrics were by Kanmani Subbu, Kalavanan Kannadasan, Uma Kannadasan, Panju Akiladasan, Aravindhan and Kavingnar Muthudasanaar.

Reception 
N. Krishnaswamy of The Indian Express wrote, "The director is aided with fine efforts by fine dialogues from [..] Kanmani Subbu, as well as music from Chanakya and neat performances from Vaishnavi, Raja, Vijayachandrika, Radha Ravi and Ramya Krishnan et al". C. R. K. of Kalki wrote .

References

External links 
 

1990s mystery films
1990s supernatural horror films
1990s Tamil-language films
1991 films
1991 horror films
Films about witchcraft
Films set in 1991
Indian mystery films
Indian remakes of American films
Indian supernatural horror films
Tamil films remade in other languages